Microtis globula, commonly known as the globular mignonette orchid or globular onion orchid is a species of orchid endemic to the south-west coastal region of Western Australia. It has a single hollow, onion-like leaf and up to thirty five small greenish-yellow, almost globe-shaped flowers. It often grows in large colonies but only flowers after hot fires the previous summer.

Description
Flowering occurs from December to January but only after a hot or late fire the previous summer.

Taxonomy and naming
Microtis globula was first formally described in 1984 by Robert John Bates from a specimen collected near Walpole and the description was published in Journal of the Adelaide Botanic Gardens. The specific epithet (globula) is from the Latin word "globulus" meaning "a little ball" or "globule", referring to the shape of the flowers.

Distribution and habitat
The globular mignonette orchid grows in peaty, winter-wet areas between Albany and Northcliffe in the Jarrah Forest and Warren biogeographic regions.

Conservation
Microtis globula is classified as "Priority Four" by the Government of Western Australia Department of Parks and Wildlife, meaning that is rare or near threatened. It is also classified as "vulnerable" under the Commonwealth Government Environment Protection and Biodiversity Conservation Act 1999 (EPBC) Act. The main threat to the species is inappropriate fire regimes.

References

External links
 

globula
Endemic orchids of Australia
Orchids of Western Australia
Plants described in 1984
Endemic flora of Southwest Australia